Jantar may refer to:

Jantar, Poland, a village in Poland
Anna Jantar (1950 – 1980), a Polish singer
SZD-38 Jantar 1, a glider designed and produced in Poland from 1971
SZD-41 Jantar Standard, Standard Class glider
SZD-42 Jantar 2, Open Class competition glider
SZD-48 Jantar Standard 2/3, a Standard Class glider produced in Poland from 1977
 Amber, fossilized tree resin

See also
Jandar (disambiguation)
Yantar (disambiguation)